Choi Bo-in is a beauty pageant contestant who represented Korea in Miss World 2008 in South Africa. She studied international studies at the Ewha Womans University.

External links
 Miss Korea Official Profile
 Miss Korea 2008

1986 births
Living people
Miss World 2008 delegates
Miss Korea delegates
Ewha Womans University alumni